Parliamentary elections were held in Guam on 7 November 1950.

Background
Following the controversy of the Guam Congress Walkout in March 1949, the United States Congress passed the Guam Organic Act of 1950 on 23 May 1950, creating a 21-member Congress.

Electoral system
The 21 members were elected from a single district, with the candidates receiving the most votes being elected. Candidates were required to be at least 25 years old and have lived in Guam for at least five years before the election.

Results
Voter turnout was around 65%.

Elected members

Aftermath
Following the elections, Antonio Borja Won Pat was elected Speaker. The legislature was originally known as the Eleventh Guam Congress, but one of its first acts was to rename the Congress the Legislature, becoming the First Legislature.

See also
1st Guam Legislature

References

1950 in Guam
Legislative elections in Guam
Guam
November 1950 events in Oceania